Paul Williams (born 11 April 1985) is a professional rugby union referee from New Zealand who currently referees in the Super Rugby competition and in international test matches.

Williams started refereeing in 2011 while still playing at halfback at club level and was appointed to the New Zealand High Performance referee squad in 2014. He quickly rose up the domestic ranks of refereeing, ultimately becoming a full-time referee on the Super Rugby panel in 2016, the first ever from Taranaki.

Williams refereed the 2016 World Rugby U20 Championship final between England and Ireland.

In June 2017, Williams took charge of his first international test match, the clash between Italy and Scotland in Singapore.

2018 saw Williams referee eight Super Rugby matches as well as three further Tier 1 tests.

Williams was selected to referee at the 2019 Rugby World Cup in Japan.

Williams was the first New Zealand born referee to officiate an All Blacks’ test in 40 years when he controlled the first match of the 2020 Bledisloe Cup series at Sky Stadium in Wellington On 10 October.

References

1985 births
Living people
People from Taranaki
New Zealand rugby union referees
Rugby World Cup referees
People educated at Francis Douglas Memorial College
Super Rugby referees